Wollert is a suburb in Melbourne, Victoria, Australia, 26 km north of Melbourne's central business district, located within the City of Whittlesea local government area.

History

"Wollert" is a Woiwurrung word meaning "where possums abound", and the suburb takes its name from the land parish in which part of it is situated. From 1836 until the early 1850s, sheep raising was the main activity.  Summerhill farm on Summerhill Road was built by Thomas Wilson, in the 1850s. He ran a dairy, pig and sheep farm. When he sold the property in 1886 it was regarded as one of the finest farming properties in Victoria at the time.

A bluestone house and outbuildings, a bluestone quarry and dry stone wall in Bindts Road, Wollert are considered of high local significance. Hehr's Pine Park Farm complex in Epping Road illustrates early German building practices the manner of which the resources of the land were put to use and the dairy and horse breeding industries.

In 1853, much of the land was subdivided into smaller farm lots, and necessary access roads laid out. During this period Wollert became a dairying community, with significant dairy production continuing for the Melbourne market until the 1960s. In more recent years, dairying has largely ceased and smaller-scale grazing and Wollert's quarrying and brickmaking facilities represent the suburb's main industries.

The first school, established by the Church of England, commenced in 1852. A bluestone Government school replaced it in 1877 and continued until 1994.  The Wollert General Store is still in operation, but the adjacent Dance Palais is no longer is use. Wollert Post Office opened on 1 September 1876, closed in 1895, then reopened in 1902.

During the late 1940s, several large Wollert properties were purchased by the Soldier Settlement. They were then subdivided and allocated to eligible ex-servicemen.

A Methodist Church was built in 1878 to replace an earlier one built in 1859. This church continued as the Wollert Uniting Church but later closed. The building has a historic and social value for the City of Whittlesea. Its architecture expresses key characteristics of the Carpenter Gothic style, including timber cladding and lancet windows. In May 2022 Major Road Projects Victoria announced that they will be relocating and restoring the church as part of the Epping Road Upgrade. It will be moved to the Carome Homestead in Mernda.

Wollert Rise and Riverhills are two of the most popular estates located in Wollert, managed by Dahua Group. The Patch residential and community development at Bodycoats Road is managed by Jinding property development.

Landmarks 
 Australia's largest brickmaker, Brickworks Limited, operates a plant in Wollert.
 "The Christian Church in Melbourne" has its meeting hall at Wollert, on the site of the former Government school.

Notable locals
 Trent Cotchin – AFL footballer Cotchin close named after him
 Joe Habbaki - International hairdressing award winner with TONI AND GUY Worldwide | https://www.toniandguy.com.au/salons/vic-locations/armadale/ |

References

Australian soldier settlements
Suburbs of Melbourne
Suburbs of the City of Whittlesea
Hume Highway